The 1995 San Miguel Beermen season was the 21st season of the franchise in the Philippine Basketball Association (PBA).

Draft picks

Retirement
Ramon Fernandez, who spent his last seven seasons with San Miguel Beer and one of the only three remaining pioneers in the PBA and the league's winningest cager with 19 titles, retired from active playing after 20 seasons at age 41.

Point guard Hector Calma, who's been with San Miguel since returning to the league in 1986 and was a key factor in the Beermen's Grandslam conquest in 1989, also decided to retire as he was saddled with injuries for most of the 1994 season.

Melchor Ravanes, who played for San Miguel from 1980-1985 and returned to the team from 1992-1994, decided to retire too and call it quits after 15 seasons.

Summary
The defending All-Filipino champions beat Ginebra, 90-87, in their first game as the league returns to the Araneta Coliseum on February 24 after a decade. The Beermen had a hard time scoring victories with new acquisitions in their lineup. San Miguel defeated Pepsi Mega, 95-82, in their last game in the eliminations on April 4 for their fourth win in 10 games.  The Beermen were ousted from the semifinals along with Ginebra and Pepsi.  

Import John Best led the Beermen to four straight victories in the Commissioners Cup.  San Miguel enters the quarterfinal round with six wins and four losses, the Beermen blew a chance to make it to the best-of-five semifinals when they lost to Purefoods, 103-104 in overtime, in their do-or-die battle on August 6 as both teams carry an 8-6 won-loss card on the last day of the quarterfinals. It was the first time the Beermen placed no higher than fourth in the first two conferences of the season since returning in 1986.

Kenny Travis is the Beermen's reinforcement in the season-ending conference for the fourth straight year. During the ongoing eliminations, a trade took place when San Miguel gave up pre-season acquisition Victor Pablo to Shell in exchange for Paul Alvarez. From a 6-4 won-loss slate in the eliminations, the Beermen advances in the Governors Cup finals on December 3 with the help of Formula Shell upsetting grandslam-seeking Sunkist Orange Juicers earlier in the first game, the Beermen easily won over their finals opponent Alaska Milkmen, 103-87, in the second game for their 12th win in 18 games and winning six of their eight semifinal assignments. 

In the championship series between the last two Governors Cup titlist, San Miguel led three games to two and one win away from winning the crown. The Beermen were up by 16 points in the second quarter of Game Six but the Milkmen battled back in the second half to win the ballgame. In the deciding Game Seven, the Beermen were leading by four points with less than six minutes remaining in the fourth period but they went on to lose by 13 points, 86-99, as the Alaska Milkmen were able to retain the title they won from last season.

Roster

Transactions

Additions

Trades

Late-season trade

Recruited imports

References

San Miguel Beermen seasons
San